Samson and Delilah is a 1949 American romantic biblical drama film produced and directed by Cecil B. DeMille and released by Paramount Pictures. It depicts the biblical story of Samson, a strongman whose secret lies in his uncut hair, and his love for Delilah, the woman who seduces him, discovers his secret, and then betrays him to the Philistines. It stars Victor Mature and Hedy Lamarr in the title roles, George Sanders as the Saran, Angela Lansbury as Semadar, and Henry Wilcoxon as Prince Ahtur.

Pre-production on the film began as early as 1935, but principal photography officially commenced in 1948. The screenplay, written by Jesse L. Lasky Jr. and Fredric M. Frank, is based on the biblical Book of Judges and adapted from original film treatments by Harold Lamb and Vladimir Jabotinsky.

Upon its release, the film was praised for its Technicolor cinematography, lead performances, costumes, sets, and innovative special effects. After premiering in New York City on 21 December 1949, Samson and Delilah opened in Los Angeles on 13 January 1950. A massive commercial success, it became the highest-grossing film of 1950, and the third highest-grossing film ever at the time of its release. Of its five Academy Award nominations, the film won two for Best Art Direction and Best Costume Design.

Plot 
Samson, a Danite Hebrew placed under Nazirite vows from birth by his mother Hazelelponit, is engaged to a Philistine woman named Semadar. At their wedding feast, Samson loses a bet with his wedding guests because of Semadar and attacks 30 Philistines to strip them of their cloaks to pay his betting debt. 

After paying his debt, Samson searches for Semadar, only to learn that her father Tubal married her to a Philistine once Samson left the wedding to pay his debt. A fight breaks out between Samson and the Philistines, which results in the death of Semadar and Tubal. Samson becomes a hunted man, and in his fury he begins fighting the Philistines. 

The Saran of Gaza imposes heavy taxes on the Danites, with the purpose of having Samson betrayed by his own people. The Saran's plan works, and frustrated Danites hand over Samson to the Philistines, much to the joy of Delilah, Semadar's younger sister. Samson is taken by Prince Ahtur, the military governor of the land of Dan, and a regiment of Philistine troops. En route back to Gaza, Ahtur decides to taunt Samson. Samson rips apart his chains and ropes and begins to combat the Philistines, toppling Ahtur's war chariot and using the jawbone of an ass to club the Philistine soldiers to death.

News of the defeat of Ahtur at the hands of Samson reaches the Saran. The Saran ponders how to defeat Samson. Delilah comes up with the idea of seducing Samson, thus having him reveal the secret of his strength and then deliver him for punishment. Her plan works; she cuts his hair, which gives him his strength. To fully neutralize him, Samson is blinded by his captors and put to slave work, and is eventually brought to the temple of Dagon for the entertainment of the Philistines and the Saran. However, Delilah has been in love with Samson ever since his engagement with Semadar, and his blindness and torture make her feel deep remorse over her betrayal. She initially had betrayed him because she wanted to avenge the deaths of her father and sister, which she thought were caused "because of Samson."

Delilah later attends the public torture of Samson wielding a whip, which she uses to guide him to the temple's main support pillars. Once he stands between them, he tells Delilah to flee, but she remains, unseen by him, as he pushes the pillars apart. The pillars give way and the temple collapses, burying Samson, Delilah, and all the Philistines, including the court. In the end, the temple lies in rubble, and Saul and Miriam, his two closest Danite Hebrew friends, are left to mourn Samson's death.

Cast 

 Hedy Lamarr as Delilah
 Victor Mature as Samson
 George Sanders as The Saran of Gaza
 Angela Lansbury as Semadar
 Henry Wilcoxon as Prince Ahtur
 Olive Deering as Miriam
 Fay Holden as Hazelelponit
 Julia Faye as Hisham
 Russ Tamblyn as Saul
 William Farnum as Tubal
 Lane Chandler as Teresh
 Moroni Olsen as Targil
 Francis McDonald as Storyteller
 Wee Willie Davis as Garmiskar
 John Miljan as Lesh Lakish
 Arthur Q. Bryan as Fat Philistine Merchant
 Laura Elliot as Spectator
 Victor Varconi as Lord of Ashdod
 John Parrish as Lord of Gath
 Frank Wilcox as Lord of Ekron
 Russell Hicks as Lord of Ashkelon
 Boyd Davis as First Priest
 Fritz Leiber as Lord Sharif
 Mike Mazurki as Leader of Philistine Soldiers
 Davison Clark as Merchant Prince
 George Reeves as Wounded Messenger
 Pedro de Cordoba as Bar Simon
 Frank Reicher as Village Barber
 Colin Tapley as Prince
 Charles Evans as Manoah (uncredited)
 Harry Woods as Gammad (uncredited)
 Gordon Richards as Guide (uncredited)
 Cecil B. DeMille as Narrator (uncredited) 
 Tanner the Lion as Lion (uncredited)

Production

Development 

In April 1934, Paramount Pictures announced that its next "big picture" and DeMille's follow-up to Cleopatra (1934) would be Samson and Delilah, starring Henry Wilcoxon and Miriam Hopkins in the title roles. The film was eventually postponed and DeMille decided to produce and direct The Crusades (1935).

In May 1935, Motion Picture Daily informed that Samson and Delilah was "slated to start five weeks after the completion of The Crusades." Paramount bought the film rights to the music and libretto of the 1877 opera Samson et Dalila. DeMille paid $10,000 to historian Harold Lamb to write a film treatment of the biblical story of Samson and Delilah, which DeMille regarded as "one of the greatest love stories of all time." Jeanie MacPherson was also hired to do research and collaborate with Lamb on the screenplay. DeMille considered filming it in the new three-strip Technicolor. After the release of The Crusades, Paramount negotiated a new contract with DeMille and cancelled Samson and Delilah in 1936.

Ten years later, on August 15, 1946, DeMille publicly stated that Samson and Delilah would be his next project after Unconquered (1947). DeMille later recalled in his autobiography that the Paramount executives had doubts about financing a "Sunday school tale." They approved the project when DeMille showed them a sketch by artist Dan Groesbeck depicting a "big, brawny" Samson and a "slim and ravishingly attractive" Delilah. He initially planned to film it in 1947, but in October 1947, he said he would produce the film the following year with a "budget to be based on the anticipated world gross at that time."

In spring of 1948, DeMille hired illustrator Henry Clive to paint the "ideal Delilah" on canvas. He had studied paintings of Delilah by Peter Paul Rubens, Rembrandt, Gustave Doré, and Solomon Joseph Solomon, but wanted her to look modern. DeMille said his Delilah "must have a dangerous capacity for vengeance. Warm, soft, cunning. A combination of Vivien Leigh and Jean Simmons with a dash of Lana Turner." In July, he hired Henry Noerdlinger as a research coordinator.

Adding to his dramatization of the biblical story, DeMille bought the rights to Samson the Nazirite (published in the United States as Judge and Fool), a 1927 novel by Vladimir Jabotinsky, who portrayed Delilah as the younger sister of Samson's Philistine wife. He felt the novel "made possible a connected drama" for the film.  Jesse L. Lasky Jr. and Fredric M. Frank completed the 186-page script on September 7, 1948.

Casting 

When DeMille first commenced production on the film in 1935, Dolores del Río, Paulette Goddard, and Joan Crawford were suggested for the part of Delilah. DeMille chose Paramount actress Miriam Hopkins as Delilah and his new star Henry Wilcoxon as Samson.

Once production restarted in 1947, DeMille and his staff considered dozens of Hollywood actors and actresses for the title roles. He said, "For Samson, I want a combination Tarzan, Robin Hood, and Superman. For Delilah ... a sort of distilled Jean Simmons, Vivien Leigh and a generous touch of Lana Turner."  Those considered were Märta Torén, Viveca Lindfors, Lana Turner, Rita Hayworth, Susan Hayward, Ava Gardner, Jane Greer, Greer Garson, Maureen O'Hara, Rhonda Fleming, Jeanne Crain, Lucille Ball, Jennifer Jones, Vivien Leigh, Gail Russell, Alida Valli, Linda Darnell, Patricia Neal, Jean Simmons, and Nancy Olson. DeMille cast Hedy Lamarr (who was of Jewish descent, as was DeMille himself on his mother's side) as Delilah after screening the film The Strange Woman (1946), which featured Ian Keith (a contender for the role of the Saran). DeMille first wanted Lamarr to play Esther in a biblical film he was planning to make in 1939, but the film was never realized. However, he was content with Lamarr's performance as Delilah, describing it as "more than skin-deep." He also described her as "a gazelle–incapable of a clumsy or wrong move", and she would flirtatiously refer to herself as "Delilah" and DeMille as her "Samson."

Burt Lancaster was the original choice to play Samson, but he declined due to a bad back. Body builder Steve Reeves was also considered and DeMille lobbied long and hard to get the studio to pick up Reeves, but both DeMille and the studio wanted Reeves to tone down his physique, which Reeves, still young and new to the industry, ultimately refused to do. DeMille finally decided to cast Victor Mature as Samson after admiring his performance in the film Kiss of Death (1947).

Phyllis Calvert was originally cast as Semadar, but she relinquished the part due to illness. Therefore, DeMille cast Angela Lansbury in the role in July 1948. When Lawrence Perry of The Pittsburgh Press interviewed Lansbury on September 24, 1949, he told her that the Bible does not describe Delilah as having a sister. Lansbury replied, "Anyway, if Delilah didn't have a sister, Mr. DeMille has supplied one."

Kasey Rogers auditioned and was screen-tested for the role of Miriam, the Danite girl who loves Samson. But DeMille told her, "You're too pretty and you're too young", and Rogers was cast as a Philistine spectator in the temple scene and credited in the film as Laura Elliot. Rogers was given a close-up and several lines, including "Why can't I lead you like that?" and "It [the column] moved!" The role of Miriam was given to stage actress Olive Deering, who received sixth billing after the five main stars.

Filming 

Principal photography began on October 4, 1948 and ended on December 22, 1948. The scenes involving the plowed field were shot on January 4, 1949, and added scenes and closeups were shot between January 18 and January 21, 1949.

The film's special effects were supervised by Gordon Jennings. The most spectacular special effect in the film is the toppling of the temple of Dagon, the god of the Philistines. It is the penultimate scene in the film, cost $150,000, and took a year to shoot. The bottom portion of the temple was constructed full-scale. A separate 37-foot high model with a 17-foot high Dagon statue was built for the photographic effects. The model was destroyed three times in order to shoot it through different camera angles. Footage of the full-scale set was merged with footage of the scale model using a "motion repeater system" fabricated by Paramount, which enabled the exact repetition of camera moves.

Victor Mature was frightened by a number of the animals and mechanical props used in the production, including the lions, the wind machine, the swords and even the water.  This infuriated DeMille, who bellowed through his megaphone at the assembled cast and crew:  "I have met a few men in my time. Some have been afraid of heights, some have been afraid of water, some have been afraid of fire, some have been afraid of closed spaces. Some have even been afraid of open spaces -- or themselves. But in all my 35 years of picture-making experience, Mr. Mature, I have not until now met a man who was 100 percent yellow."

Despite the renown of this iconic Biblical story depicting their battle against the Philistines, the oppressed people represented by Samson are never once referred to as "Israelites", "Hebrews" or "Jewish" people.  They are referred to only as Danites, members of the Tribe of Dan. This omission—or avoidance—occurred in the early days of the witch hunt into Communist—often Jewish—influence when Hollywood studio chiefs were very sensitive to the fact that the film industry was generally considered to be run by Jews.

Connection with Sunset Boulevard 
DeMille's legendary status led him to play himself in Billy Wilder's film noir Sunset Boulevard (1950). The film is about a fictional silent film star named Norma Desmond (played by Gloria Swanson) who, no longer active, once worked as an actress for DeMille. For the scene in which Desmond visits DeMille at Paramount, an actual set of Samson and Delilah was reconstructed to show the director at work. The first day scheduled to shoot the scene was May 23, 1949, months after filming on Samson and Delilah had ended. After the scene was shot in a total of four days, Wilder patted DeMille on the back and humorously told him, "Very good, my boy. Leave your name with my secretary. I may have a small part for you in my next picture." Wilder later said that DeMille "took direction terrifically. He loved it. He understood it. He was very subtle."

Release 

Samson and Delilah received its televised world premiere on December 21, 1949, at two of New York City's Broadway theatres, the Paramount and the Rivoli, in order to "accommodate the 7,000,000 movie-goers in the greater New York area." People who attended the event included Mary Pickford, Buddy Rogers, and Barney Balaban. The film eventually went into general release on January 13, 1950.

It was successfully re-released in November 1959 following the box office triumph of Joseph E. Levine's Hercules (1958).

Critical response 

Samson and Delilah received rave reviews upon its release in 1949. Showmen's Trade Review wrote that the film "bids fair to stand as this veteran showman's most impressive and magnificent spectacle since that history-making 1923 religious epic [The Ten Commandments]." The Harrison's Reports reviewer commented: "Mr. DeMille has succeeded, not only in keeping the story authentic, but also in presenting it in a highly entertaining way. Its combination of spectacularity and human interest will grip the attention of all movie-goers." The Modern Screen reviewer remarked, "It's tremendous, impressive, and beautiful to look at." Boxoffice considered it the "most prodigious spectacle ever conceived," while The Film Daily stated that it "[s]tands monumental alongside any contender." The Exhibitor, a trade magazine, declared: "This will be classed with the big films of all time."

Variety appreciated the film's cast by writing, "Victor Mature fits neatly into the role of the handsome but dumb hulk of muscle that both the Bible and DeMille make of the Samson character. Hedy Lamarr never has been more eye-filling and makes of Delilah a convincing minx. George Sanders gives a pleasantly light flavor of satirical humor to the part of the ruler, while Henry Wilcoxon is duly rugged as the military man." Bosley Crowther of The New York Times admired the "dazzling displays of splendid costumes, of sumptuous settings and softly tinted flesh which Mr. DeMille's color cameras have brilliantly pageanted ... Color has seldom been more lushly or unmistakably used."

Film critic Leonard Maltin, in his review for Samson and Delilah, wrote: "With expected DeMille touches, this remains a tremendously entertaining film."

Box office 
Samson and Delilah was enormously successful, earning $9 million in theatrical rentals in its initial release, thus making it the highest-grossing film of 1950.  At the time of its release, it was the third highest-grossing film ever, behind Gone with the Wind (1939) and The Best Years of Our Lives (1946).  It was the second most popular film at the British box office that year.

In its reissue in 1959 it earned another $2.5 million in rentals.

Accolades 

In December 1949, Cecil B. DeMille was awarded the Parents magazine medal for "thirty-five years of devotion to research in the production of historical pictures culminating in his greatest achievement, Samson and Delilah."

The Christian Herald and the Protestant Motion Picture Council presented DeMille with its December 1949 Picture of the Month Award for Samson and Delilah.

In March 1950, Samson and Delilah was named one of the Best Pictures of 1949 at Looks Annual Film Awards. Cecil B. DeMille received the All Industry Achievement Award for the film.

In December 1950, DeMille received the Boxoffice Barometer Trophy as the producer of Samson and Delilah, the "highest-grossing picture of the year."

At the 8th Golden Globe Awards on February 28, 1951, Samson and Delilah was nominated for Best Color Cinematography (George Barnes).

At the 23rd Academy Awards on March 29, 1951, Samson and Delilah won for Best Color Art Direction (art directors Hans Dreier and Walter H. Tyler and set decorators Samuel M. Comer and Ray Moyer) and Best Color Costume Design (Edith Head, Dorothy Jeakins, Elois Jenssen, Gile Steele, and Gwen Wakeling). It was also nominated for three more awards: Best Color Cinematography (George Barnes), Best Music Score of a Dramatic or Comedy Picture (Victor Young), and Best Special Effects (Cecil B. DeMille Productions).

In May 1951, British moviegoers voted Hedy Lamarr's Delilah the tenth "best screen performance by an actress."

In June 1952, Samson and Delilah won the Film français Grand Prix for Best Foreign Film of 1951. Presented to DeMille, the Grand Prix is a small bronze replica of the Winged Victory of Samothrace displayed at the Louvre Museum.

The film is recognized by American Film Institute in these lists:
 2002: AFI's 100 Years...100 Passions – Nominated
 2005: AFI's 100 Years of Film Scores – Nominated
 2008: AFI's 10 Top 10 – Nominated Epic Film

Home media 
In 1979, Paramount Home Video released the film on VHS and Betamax as a two-tape set. The VHS was released again in 1981  as a single-tape release, and then again in 1988 and 1990.

MCA DiscoVision was originally set to release the film on LaserDisc as part of a set of titles from Paramount Pictures in 1978, but their version was scrapped for unknown reasons. The first LaserDisc edition of Samson and Delilah was finally released in 1982. Ten years later, Paramount released a new LaserDisc edition that featured digital video transferred from a new 35mm interpositive of the original 3-strip Technicolor negatives. DiscoVision's transfer, however, was used in the 1979 VHS and 1980s home media releases.

In 2012, a digital restoration of Samson and Delilah was completed. The original three-strip Technicolor camera negatives were scanned at 4K on a Northlight scanner and then registered, cleaned, and color corrected in 4K by Technicolor Los Angeles. The original music overture was restored and the film's original audio track was cleaned. The restored version received its premiere at Cineteca Bologna's Il Cinema Ritrovato 2012. Paramount Home Media Distribution released the film on DVD (with English, French, and Spanish audio and subtitles) on March 12, 2013. The film was released on Blu-ray Disc (with the original theatrical trailer) on March 11, 2014.

See also 
List of epic films

References

Bibliography

External links 

 
 
 
 
 

1949 drama films
1949 films
American epic films
American drama films
Fictional couples
Films about Samson
Films directed by Cecil B. DeMille
Films scored by Victor Young
Films set in the 11th century BC
Films shot in Algeria
Films shot in Lone Pine, California
Films that won the Best Costume Design Academy Award
Films whose art director won the Best Art Direction Academy Award
Paramount Pictures films
Religious epic films
1940s English-language films
1940s American films
Films about antisemitism